Thangmeiband  (Vidhan Sabha constituency) is one of the 60 Vidhan Sabha constituencies in the Indian state of Manipur.

Members of Legislative Assembly

Election results

2017 result

2015 by-election

2012 election

See also
 Imphal West district
Manipur Legislative Assembly
List of constituencies of Manipur Legislative Assembly

References

External link
 

Assembly constituencies of Manipur
Imphal East district